Khondab Rural District is a rural district (dehestan) in the Central District of Khondab County, Markazi Province, Iran. At the 2006 census, its population was 9,127, in 2,189 families. The rural district has 24 villages.

References 

Rural Districts of Markazi Province
Khondab County